Miss Hong Kong 2008 The 36th Miss Hong Kong Pageant which was televised live internationally from the Hong Kong Convention and Exhibition Centre on 19 July 2008. Twenty-two-year-old Edelweiss Cheung became the new Miss Hong Kong and the tallest Miss Hong Kong, in the history of the pageant. Skye Chan the first runner-up and replaced Edelweiss during her duties due to Edelweiss not showing up. Skye Chan represented Hong Kong in Miss World 2008, and Miss Chinese International 2009. Second runner-up Sire Ma represented Hong Kong at Miss International 2008

The Miss Hong Kong 2008 was televised live internationally over Hong Kong, Singapore, New Zealand and Australia and was broadcast by TVB.

Results

Placements

Special Awards
Miss Photogenic: 11 Sire Ma
Miss International Goodwill: 6 Skye Chan
Miss Tourism Ambassador: 4 Samantha Ko
Miss Trendy Vision: 7 Hilda Leung

Swimsuit Competition Scores

 Winner
 First Runner-up
 Second Runner-up
 Top 5 Finalist
 Top 8 Semifinalist
(#) Rank in each round of competition

Delegates
The Miss Hong Kong 2008 delegates were:

Judges
Main Judging Panel:
 Mr.Ronnie Wong, JP
 Mr.Raymond Lee, BBS, JP
 Mrs.Perveen Crawford
 Ms.Olivia Cheng, Miss Hong Kong 1979
 Mr.Leon Lai, MH

Miss Photogenic judging panel:
 Ms.Karena Lam
 Mr.Michael Miu
 Ms.Lisa S.
 Mr.Henry Lau

Post-pageant notes
Skye Chan unplaced in Miss World 2008 in Johannesburg, South Africa. She replaced Edelweiss Cheung, Miss Hong Kong 2008, as Cheung could not compete due to personal reasons.
Skye Chan placed as 1st runner-up in Miss Chinese International Pageant 2009 in Foshan, China. She replaced Edelweiss Cheung, Miss Hong Kong 2008, as Cheung could not compete due to health reasons.
Sire Ma unplaced in Miss International 2008 in Macau, China.

References

External links
 Official Site

Miss Hong Kong Pageants
2008 beauty pageants
2008 in Hong Kong